New adult (NA) fiction is a developing genre of fiction with protagonists in the 18–29 age bracket. St. Martin's Press first coined the term in 2009, when they held a special call for "fiction similar to young adult fiction (YA) that can be published and marketed as adult—a sort of an 'older YA' or 'new adult'". New adult fiction tends to focus on issues such as leaving home, developing sexuality, and negotiating education and career choices. The genre has gained popularity rapidly over the last few years, particularly through books by self-published bestselling authors like Jennifer L. Armentrout, Cora Carmack, Colleen Hoover, Anna Todd, and Jamie McGuire. 

The genre originally faced criticism, as some viewed it as a marketing scheme, while others claimed the readership was not there to publish the material. In contrast, others claimed the term was necessary; a publicist for HarperCollins described it as "a convenient label because it allows parents and bookstores and interested readers to know what is inside".

Examples of books in the new adult genre include Sarah J. Maas's A Court of Thorns and Roses and Throne of Glass, Jennifer L. Armentrout's Wait For You and Blood and Ash series, Jamie McGuire's Beautiful Disaster, Colleen Hoover's Slammed, Cora Carmack's Losing It, Kendall Ryan's The Impact of You and Casey McQuiston's Red, White & Royal Blue.

Marketing
This category is intended to be marketed to post-adolescents and young adults ages 18 to 29. This age group is considered to be the lucrative "cross-over" category of young-adult titles that appeal to both the young-adult market and to an adult audience. Publishers of young-adult fiction now favor this category as it encompasses a far broader audience. The chief features that distinguish the new adult fiction category from young adult fiction are the perspective of the young protagonist and the scope of the protagonist's life experience. Perspective is gained as childhood innocence fades and life experience is gained, which brings insight. It is this insight which is lacking in traditional young-adult fiction. The other main differences are characters' ages and the settings. YA does not usually include main characters over age 18 or in college, but these characters are featured in new adult books. New adult can best be described as the age category after young adult.

Themes and issues
New adult literature touches upon many themes and issues to reach the readership that falls in between the categories of young adult and adult fiction.

Many themes covered in young adult fiction such as identity, sexuality, depression, suicide, drug abuse, alcohol abuse, familial struggles, bullying are also covered in new adult fiction, but the various issues that are dealt with in the category hold it separate. Some common examples of issues include first jobs, starting college, wedding engagements and marriage, starting new families, friendships post-high school, military enlistment, financial independence, living away from home for the first time, empowerment, loss of innocence, and fear of failure.

This category focuses heavily on life after an individual has become of legal age, and how one deals with the new beginnings of adulthood. Commonly, these themes and issues have been seen taking place post-high school in popular new adult fiction titles, but there are exceptions.

Genre
Like the fiction categories of young adult and adult, new adult fiction can combine with all genres and subgenres. Science fiction, urban fiction, horror, paranormal, dystopia, etc. are some examples.

Controversies

Publishing industry
Many agents and large publishing houses have yet to recognize the category due to various issues. Some view the category as a marketing scheme, while others claim the readership is not there to publish the material. Therefore, authors have turned to self-publishing as a means to get their books out into the market. The success of these authors has led to many independent publishing houses and agents opening up to the category. Publishers are now publishing these books with many of the bestsellers having deals with large publishers.

Sex
In 2012, new adult fiction saw a rise in the romance subgenre of contemporary when self-published titles such as Slammed by Colleen Hoover, Easy by Tamarra Webber, and Beautiful Disaster by Jamie McGuire were acquired by major publishing houses. Some believe this jump in response to the category came from the release of the popular erotic novel Fifty Shades of Grey, which featured a heroine in college. Since new adult fiction tackles issues such as sex and sexuality and many of the categories' successful titles deal with those same issues the category itself and the single issue of sex have been stated as synonymous, and even been called over-sexualized versions of young adult fiction. Both readers and authors of the category combat the claim by stating that the category deals with the exploration of a character's life, and that sex is not ubiquitous in new adult titles.

2009 to present
Following the end of the St. Martin's Press contest, the new adult category has become increasingly popular through self-publishing.  Major New York publishers are taking self-published authors of these titles and acquiring them for mass market sales.  Some authors include:

Cora Carmack for Losing It
Sylvia Day for Reflected in You
 Colleen Hoover for Slammed and Point of Retreat
 Jamie McGuire for Beautiful Disaster
 Tammara Webber for Easy

Authors
Some noteworthy authors of the category include:

 Gemma Burgess
 Katy Evans
 Abbi Glines
 Sarah J. Maas
 J.A. Redmerski
 Sylvain Reynard
 Jessica Sorensen

References

External links 
Goodreads.com: List of popular new adult fiction books

Fiction by genre
Literary genres
Narratology
Teen fiction
Young adult fiction
Youth culture
2009 neologisms